David Caves (born 7 August 1979) is a Northern Irish actor who is best known for his role as Jack Hodgson in the BBC drama series Silent Witness. After graduating from London Academy of Music and Dramatic Art (LAMDA) in 2005, Caves has appeared in a variety of stage productions, including The Beggar’s Opera at Regent’s Park Open Air Theatre and The Changeling at the Southwark Playhouse.

Early life
Caves was educated at Campbell College, Belfast. His parents and his uncle were all teachers. Caves studied modern languages, including French and German, at the University of St Andrews from 1997 to 2002.

He originally planned to become a teacher before training at LAMDA. He worked as a teacher in France as part of his university course but when he returned to the UK he found he had "lost the drive for the academic side of things" and found himself getting heavily involved in plays and musicals at the university. He is quoted as saying,

Career
Caves was offered places at both LAMDA and Bristol Old Vic, opting for the former because of the lure of London. His training focused on theatre and, prior to his addition to the Silent Witness cast, he was known as a stage actor, having impressed as Petruchio in the Royal Shakespeare Company's 2012 touring production of The Taming of the Shrew. He has also starred in Ironclad: Battle for Blood.

Other notable roles in theatre include Deflores in The Changeling, Southwark Playhouse; Macheath in The Beggar’s Opera at Regent's Park Open Theatre and Bosola in The Duchess of Malfi, Northampton.

In 2014, Caves also featured in the television documentary The Crime Thriller Club. Presented by Bradley Walsh, this documentary was a mix of interviews, film clips and a game show about the detective genre in both film and literature.

In 2016, Caves portrayed Clint Hill in the film Jackie.

Personal life
Caves was an ambassador for Northern Ireland Hospice.{{  }} 
He married Verity Caves (née Cunningham) in 2019.

Filmography

Theatre

References

External links

Male stage actors from Northern Ireland
Living people
People educated at Campbell College
Male television actors from Northern Ireland
Royal Shakespeare Company members
List of alumni of the University of St Andrews
Alumni of the London Academy of Music and Dramatic Art
1979 births